Bruce F. Webster is an American academic and software engineer. He is currently a principal at Bruce F. Webster & Associates and an adjunct professor in computer science at Brigham Young University.

Early life and education 
Webster studied computer science at Brigham Young University, graduating in 1978 with a bachelor's degree. He had received a full National Merit Scholarship for his studies. He went on to do graduate work in computer science at the University of Houston-Clear Lake in Houston, Texas.

Career 

Webster, since 1980, has written over 150 articles on the computer industry and software development. He has also written four books on information technology (IT) issues, including The NeXT book, Pitfalls of Object-Oriented Development, The Art of ‘Ware, and The Y2K Survival Guide, and contributed to two others. He authored PricewaterhouseCoopers' 2000 white paper, Patterns in IT Litigation: System Failure. He also wrote for two years as an IT management columnist for Baseline.

In the 1980s, Webster wrote articles and columns for BYTE and Macworld, and taught computer science at his alma mater, Brigham Young University. In the 1990s, he went on to help found another software startup, Pages Software Inc., where he served as Chief Technical Officer and chief software architect for five years. He then served as Chief Technical Officer at Object Systems Group (now OSG), reviewing troubled corporate IT projects, and subsequently worked as a Director at PricewaterhouseCoopers (ibid). He has run his own consulting firm since 2001. Since 2017 has also served as an adjunct professor for the BYU Computer Science Department, teaching a senior-level class on real-world software engineering.

Webster has appeared on TV news broadcasts and has been cited in publications including Newsweek, The Wall Street Journal, and Barron's. He has testified before Congress on three occasions, and has been consulted in several legal cases in the United States and abroad. He has been an arbitrator and a neutral expert in litigation relating to IT and has testified as an IT expert in federal and state court. As an expert on information technology, he has been an invited speaker at conferences in the US, Japan, Russia, Central America, and the Middle East.

Webster was co-designer and principal programmer of the original Apple II version of SunDog: Frozen Legacy, a real-time space trading and combat game released in 1984. SunDog was cited in late 2022 by Todd Howard of Bethesda Game Studios as one of his inspirations for their forthcoming science-fiction open world game Starfield.

Personal life 
Webster currently resides in Provo, Utah, with his wife Sandra. He has been a member of the Church of Jesus Christ of Latter-day Saints since 1967 and has played an active role in the church.

References

External links
 Bruce Webster's web site
 Bruce Webster's "And Still I Persist" blog
 Bruce Webster's "Adventures in Mormonism" blog
 Webster & Associates web site
 Webster's SunDog page
 The SunDog Resurrection project at SourceForge

Year of birth missing (living people)
Living people
American computer scientists
American Latter Day Saints
Brigham Young University alumni
Brigham Young University faculty
University of Houston–Clear Lake alumni
People from Parker, Colorado
Engineers from Colorado